Maggie Moore (April 10, 1851 – March 15, 1926) was an American-Australian actress born as Margaret Virginia Sullivan.  She met and married producer J. C. Williamson in the U.S. and became popular as an actress in their production of  Struck Oil, which premiered in 1873 and was revived many times.  Soon after their marriage, they took the play on a tour of Australia.  It was such a success that they stayed there, where he founded the most successful theatrical company in Australia, and she became a leading actress.

Moore was also successful in Williamson's Gilbert and Sullivan operas, other operetta productions, and other stage pieces.  She continued a busy acting career in Australia and on tour worldwide, ending her marriage with Williamson and later marrying actor Harry R. Roberts. She retired in 1925 and moved to San Francisco.

Life and career
Sullivan was born in San Francisco, California, in 1851 to Irish parents; her father, who died when she was eight years old, was from Dublin, and her mother was from Galway. She had seven siblings: six sisters and one brother, some of whom also appeared on the stage. She began her theatrical career at an early age and married J. C. Williamson, with whom she came to Australia in 1874. They opened in Melbourne on 1 August in the comic play Struck Oil and were immediately successful. Some weeks later they went to Sydney and, after touring Australia, to India. In 1876 Struck Oil played for 100 nights at the Adelphi Theatre, London, and was followed for a similar period by Arrah-na-Pogue, with Williamson as Shaun and his wife as Arrah. Other appearances were made in the provinces, and a successful visit was then paid to the United States.

In 1879 they were again in Australia, and Moore began playing in Gilbert and Sullivan operas. Her voice was not large, but she knew how to use it, and on occasion she took the parts of Josephine and Buttercup in H.M.S. Pinafore, Mabel and Ruth in The Pirates of Penzance and once, when the actress chosen could not appear, Katisha in The Mikado. In Patience, her part was Lady Jane. Possibly her best part in opera was Bettina, in Edmond Audran's La Mascotte.

She was versatile, and after her husband had become a member of the firm of Williamson Garner and Musgrove and had practically given up acting, she appeared in sensational drama. In the late 1880s and early 1890s she was keeping alive with her vivacity and humour such parts as Biddy Roonan in The Shadows of a Great City in 1886, and Meg in Meg the Castaway in 1890. She visited her parents in San Francisco about this time and played at a benefit in Nan the Good-for-Nothing. Returning to Australia she was in various revivals of Struck Oil with John F. Forde as John Stofel. She left her husband in the early 1890s, and they divorced by the close of the century.

Shortly after she married for the second time in 1902, to Harry R. Roberts, she toured Australia (July 1902 to July 1903), New Zealand (July to November 1903) and then Australia again (December 1903 to July 1904), with a repertoire of comedies and comedic melodramas, including Struck Oil. She left Australia for the United States via England, and until 1908 travelled in the United States and Great Britain. In London she appeared with George Graves and Billie Burke, among others.  Back in Australia she played a starring season between 1908 and 1912, occasionally reviving Struck Oil with her husband as John Stofel and making a film of the same name, which was released in October 1919.

In 1915 she returned to the Royal Comic Opera Company, and for some years played smaller parts with finish and distinction. In 1918 she played the character of Mrs Karl Pfeiffer in Friendly Enemies, and it has been said of her that "she imbued the character with a dignity and gentle pathos which crowned her long career with fresh laurels". At this time, when not touring, her home was a cottage called "Francisco" in Rose Bay, Sydney, where she kept a number of animals. In 1920 she played in the "mystery musical comedy" F.F.F., which toured in Australia. In 1920–21, she played Mahbubah in the first Australian production of Chu Chin Chow alongside C. H. Workman. She played Lizzie Stofel as her last stage performance in 1924. That year, she celebrated the fiftieth anniversary of her first appearance in Australia, and in 1925 retired to California to live with her sister, Mrs Comstock. There she was offered an engagement in Lightnin' with J. D. O'Hara, but she did not accept it.

Moore died at San Francisco after having an operation to remove her leg, following a cable car accident on March 15, 1926. Her second husband predeceased her. She was interred at Holy Cross Cemetery in Colma, California.

References

Sources

External links

Richard Refshauge, 'Moore, Maggie (1851 - 1926)', Australian Dictionary of Biography, Volume 5, Melbourne University Press, 1974, pp 279–280.
Images of theatre posters from the State Library of Tasmania.
Theatre in Melbourne 1892, including details of Maggie Moore's performances.  A Google search of this site for "Maggie Moore" provides a wealth of details about her stage career.
Miss Suey Land and Ron Wong Loy: The Children of Little Bourke Street and The Entertainment Industry - Miss Suey Land recounts fond memories of her childhood friendship with Maggie Moore.

1851 births
1926 deaths
American emigrants to Australia
Burials at Holy Cross Cemetery (Colma, California)
Australian stage actresses
19th-century Australian women
20th-century Australian women